Inga Gill (2 May 1925 – 18 October 2000) was a Swedish film actress. She was born in Stockholm and died there in 2000, aged 75, following a thrombosis.

Selected filmography

 Affairs of a Model (1946) - Waitress at Gyldene Tunnan (uncredited)
 Woman Without a Face (1947) - Signe (uncredited)
 Lars Hård (1948) - Maid (uncredited)
 Thirst (1949) - Lady at Hotel (uncredited)
 Miss Julie (1951) - Viola
 We Three Debutantes (1953) - Dancer
 Time of Desire (1954) - Ella
 The Vicious Breed (1954) - Mammie
 Mord, lilla vän (1955) - Mrs. Nygren
 Dreams (1955) - Shop assistant at bakery (uncredited)
 Friarannonsen (1955) - Stina
 Girls Without Rooms (1956) - Agneta
 Seventh Heaven (1956) - Fröken Jonasson, sångtrion Varhulta Sisters
 Sju vackra flickor (1956) - Mr. Rosander's secretary
 Lille Fridolf och jag (1956) - Maggan
 The Seventh Seal (1957) - Lisa, blacksmith's wife
 Johan på Snippen tar hem spelet (1957) - Asta
 Brink of Life (1958) - Mother (uncredited)
 Fridolf Stands Up! (1958) - Maggan Palm
 Enslingen i blåsväder (1959) - Tekla Blomqvist
 Swinging at the Castle (1959) - Mrs. Borg (uncredited)
 Crime in Paradise (1959) - Tobacconist
 Fridolfs farliga ålder (1959) - Maggan Palm
 Sängkammartjuven (1959) - Barwaitress
 The Judge (1960) - Waitress
 The Devil's Eye (1960) - The maid (uncredited)
 Vi fixar allt (1961) - Ms. Bettan Lundgren
 Drömpojken (1964) - Neighbour
 The Cats (1965) - Klara
 Drra på - kul grej på väg till Götet (1967) - Manager
 Cries and Whispers (1972) - Storyteller
 Bröllopet (1973) - Gittan Löfgren
 Raskenstam (1983) - Anna-Greta Kjellgren
 Amorosa (1986) - Miss Tollen
 Min pappa är Tarzan (1986) - Grandma

References

External links

 

1925 births
2000 deaths
Swedish film actresses
Actresses from Stockholm
Deaths from thrombosis
20th-century Swedish actresses